Campo Belo is a station of São Paulo Metro. It opened on 8 April 2019.

It is operated by ViaMobilidade and belongs to Line 5-Lilac, which connected with the metropolitain network of São Paulo on September 2018 with the opening of stations Chácara Klabin, which connects to Line 2-Green, and Santa Cruz, which connects to Line 1-Blue. It was the last station to be delivered in the expansion plan of the line. The station will also, in the future, have a connection with Line 17 (São Paulo Metro) when opened.

According to the Metro original plans, the station should be named "Água Espraiada-Campo Belo", but, because of the change of name of Brooklin station of Line 5-Lilac, the station lost the sufix "Campo Belo". Later, it switched to Campo Belo, as both Brooklin and Campo Belo are located in the same borough.

On 26 March 2019, it was informed that the station opening could happen on 10 April.

On 5 April, it was confirmed the opening of the station to 8 April, two days before what was announced before. During the first 5 days, it worked in a reduced time, from 10 a.m. to 3 p.m., and on 13 April it began working in full time.

Characteristics
The Line 5 station is in the underground, composed of 5 drying pits of great diameter, with structure in apparent concrete and main access roof with a steel and glass dome, for natural lighting. It has one access, with escalators in both ways and 3 preferential elevators for disabled and reduced mobility people. It has mezzanine with ticket offices and commuters distribution, besides the central platform.

Station layout

References

São Paulo Metro stations
Railway stations opened in 2019
Railway stations scheduled to open in 2024
Railway stations located underground in Brazil